Antonian College Preparatory High School is an archdiocesan Catholic co-educational high school for students grades 9 through 12. Antonian has been recognized as a National Blue Ribbon Catholic high school. It is located in Castle Hills, Texas. It is located in the Roman Catholic Archdiocese of San Antonio. It was founded by the Order of The Christian Brothers in 1964 as an all-male Catholic high school. The school has been regularly included in the Action Institute's Catholic High School Honor Roll, a list of the top fifty Catholic high schools in America.

Antonian Campus 
It has 39 classrooms, science laboratories, kitchen, cafeteria, auditorium, technology lab and library. Additionally, students enjoy a swimming pool, weight-lighting room, dance studio, tennis courts, a track, football field, 2 gymnasiums, and baseball field.

Notable alumni 
 Anatolio Benedicto Cruz III - 1976 - is currently Senior Vice President, Enterprise Shared Services at USAA. He was previously the reserve deputy director, maritime operations (N04R) at U.S. Fleet Forces Command from October 2012 to October 2013.
 Henry Munoz - 1977 - Designer, businessman, social justice advocate, served as chairman of the National Finance Committee for the Democratic National Committee
 Justin Rodriguez - 1992 - American politician. He served as a Democratic member of the Texas House of Representatives from 2013 until January 2019, when he resigned after being appointed to a seat on the Bexar County Commissioners Court. Rodriguez previously served on the San Antonio City Council, and was a Bexar County prosecutor.
 Anthony Alabi - 1999 - American actor and former American football offensive tackle for the Miami Dolphins and Kansas City Chiefs.
 Jonathan Holmes - 2011 -  American professional basketball player . He played college basketball for the Texas Longhorns.

References 

Catholic schools in Texas
High schools in San Antonio
Catholic secondary schools in Texas
Educational institutions established in 1964
1964 establishments in Texas